Mihai Cioc (born 14 June 1961) is a retired Romanian heavyweight judoka. Competing in the above 95 kg or open weight categories he won the European title in 1987 and bronze medals at the 1983 World Championships, 1984 Olympics and 1984 European championships.

References

External links

 

Romanian male judoka
1961 births
Living people
Judoka at the 1980 Summer Olympics
Judoka at the 1984 Summer Olympics
Olympic judoka of Romania
Olympic bronze medalists for Romania
Olympic medalists in judo
Medalists at the 1984 Summer Olympics
Universiade medalists in judo
Universiade silver medalists for Romania
20th-century Romanian people
21st-century Romanian people